Meizhou (Hakka Chinese: Mòichû) is a prefecture-level city in eastern Guangdong province, China. It comprises Meijiang District, Meixian District, Xingning City and five counties. Its built-up or metro area made up of two urban districts was home to 992,351 inhabitants.

History
Neolithic age stone tools and pottery have been discovered in dozens of places in the Meixian district of Meizhou. Ancient kiln sites from the Western Zhou Dynasty and bells from the Warring States Period were also found. Before the Qin Dynasty, Meizhou was under Nanyue rule. After Qin unified the Nanyue, Meizhou was belonged to Nanhai Commandery.

The original name of Meizhou was Chengxiang (程乡), established under the prefecture of Jingzhou during the Southern Han (917-971). The name was changed to Meizhou at the 10th century and Jiaying Prefecture at the 15th century. After 1912, it was changed back to Meizhou, the name comes from the Mei River and the Chinese name for the plum blossom.
After several subsequent shifts of jurisdiction, it became Meizhou City in 1988. Meizhou is now a  noted historical and cultural city.

Geography and climate
Meizhou is located in the northeast of Guangdong Province, bordering Fujian Province in the northeast and Jiangxi Province in the northwest. The complex geological structure was formed mainly from granite, spouting rocks, metamorphic rock, shale, sandstone, red rock and limestone.

Meizhou has a humid subtropical climate (Köppen Cfa), with short, mild, overcast winters and long, very hot, humid summers. From April to June, rainfall is the heaviest and most frequent. Though striking typhoons do not affect the area as much as the coast, the mountainous topography means that flooding is a serious concern.

Administration

The municipal government, Intermediate Court, CPC office and Public Security Bureau are located in the Jiangnan Subdistrict of the Meijiang District, on the right bank of Mei River.

Economy
Meizhou is rich in mineral and tourism resources. It has 48 kinds of minerals including coal, iron, limestone, rare clay and porcelain clay amongst others. Of these reserves manganese is ranked first in Guangdong Province. Meizhou has plenty of water resources, hot springs and certified mineral waters. There are tourism resources such as cultural historic sites constructed during the Tang Dynasty, former residences of notable figures, natural scenery of all kinds, and unique Hakka cultural sights.

Transport
Meizhou is a communication hub for the three provinces of Guangdong, Fujian, and Jiangxi and the bridge connecting the coastal and the inland areas. State  Highways 205 and 206 run across the city. Expressways, state, provincial county and  village highways extend to all parts.

In 2019 the city became the terminus for the Meizhou–Chaoshan high-speed railway which opened a new station at  providing high-speed rail links to Guangzhou, Zhuhai, Shenzhen, Shantou, Chaoshan, Yichang and Xiamen. The Guangzhou–Meizhou–Shantou railway and Meizhou-Kanshi Railway use Meizhou railway station in the city providing regular rail connections to Guangzhou, Xiamen, Shantou, Shenzhen, Dapu, Wuchang and Kunming.

The city is served by the regional Meixian Airport, with regular air routes to Guangzhou and Hong Kong.
By water, the Mei River and  Han River reach Chaozhou  and Shantou.

Culture
The Meixian dialect is considered the standard Hakka dialect, along with the neighboring Mei County and Dabu County.

Hakka people are a unique ethnic group of Han Chinese originally from around the Yellow River area, who later migrated south to avoid the chaos of war centuries ago. Due to hostility towards the new immigrants, many were forced into the mountainous regions of Guangdong Province. This migratory tradition has continued with the redistribution of Hakka people to the most remote parts of the world. Many people in Meizhou emigrated during the last century to earn money for their families, with some returning to build in their hometowns.

Many buildings are named after famous people in Meizhou, built by returning Hakkas.

Because of its mountainous location, Meizhou has numerous natural scenic areas and good air quality. Many visitors come to the Yannanfei Tea Garden to climb the mountain.

Education
Education in Meizhou has been highly valued since ancient times. The city is home to Jiaying University, a local university which also attracts Hakka students from other provinces. The university is also known for its research into Hakka culture.

Food
During the period after August or September, a sea of pomelos can be seen, especially in village orchards.

Salt baked chicken is among the most well-known Hakka dishes, found also in many other cities. Another local dish is Yong tau foo (stuffed tofu). It is said that when Hakka people first came south, there was no wheat flour for dumplings. So they substituted tofu. Meat based fillings give a special taste that became a feature of Hakka cuisine. Preserved beef and ginger candies are also locally popular.

Notable people
Low Lan Pak, founder of the Lanfang Republic.
Tjong Yong Hian (1850-1911), Chinese Hakka kapitan governor of Medan.
Tjong A Fie (18601921), Hakka Chinese businessman, banker and kapitan (Chinese major) who built a large plantation business in Sumatra, Indonesia.
Huang Zunxian (18481905), diplomat and reformer
Francis Xavier Ford (18921952),  first Catholic bishop of Meizhou (Kaying)
Xie Jinyuan (19051941), Chinese Nationalist military officer famous for commanding the Defense of Sihang Warehouse during the Battle of Shanghai in the Second World War.
Seng Saekhu (c. 1840sunknown), Thai Chinese tax farmer, the patriarch of the Shinawatra clan and the great-grandfather of Thaksin Shinawatra (Thai businessman, politician, visiting professor and former Prime Minister of Thailand) and Yingluck Shinawatra (Thai businesswoman, politician, member of the Pheu Thai Party and Thailand's first female Prime Minister). 
Ye Jianying (18971986), Chinese military general
Lin Fengmian (19001991), painter
Lee Wai Tong (19051979), Chinese footballer
Arthur Chung (19182008), 1st President of Guyana
Liu Fuzhi (19172013), Chinese politician
Leslie Cheung (19562003), Hong Kong Cantopop singer
Zhu Fenglian (1977), spokesperson of the Taiwan Affairs Office
Chen Qiqiu (1978), former badminton player and currently a coach
Liu Xijun (1988), singer
Jana Chen (1989), singer

Gallery

See also
Hakka people
Hakka cuisine
Horn House

References

External links
 Official Meizhou Government website.

 
Prefecture-level divisions of Guangdong